Kristen Robert Bowditch (born 14 January 1975) is a British former long-distance runner. He competed in the men's 5000 metres at the 2000 Summer Olympics. He represented England in the 5,000 metres event, at the 1998 Commonwealth Games in Kuala Lumpur, Malaysia.

References

External links
 

1975 births
Living people
Athletes (track and field) at the 2000 Summer Olympics
British male long-distance runners
Olympic athletes of Great Britain
Athletes (track and field) at the 1998 Commonwealth Games
Commonwealth Games competitors for England